William A. Clarke (born 1909) was an English professional footballer who played as a centre forward.

Career
Born in Manchester, Clarke played for Hyde United, Bradford City and Morecambe. For Bradford City he made a single appearance in the Football League in 1928.

Sources

References

1909 births
Year of death missing
English footballers
Hyde United F.C. players
Bradford City A.F.C. players
Morecambe F.C. players
English Football League players
Association football forwards